Jam Session is a 1944 American musical film starring Ann Miller.

Plot
Terry Baxter is a dancer from small town Kansas, trying desperately to break into movies after traveling to Hollywood. She does everything from sneaking onto sound stages and disguising herself but she doesn’t have any luck. She then meets a screenwriter who is also new to Hollywood, and she poses as his private secretary, all in an act to have access to the studio and try and see studio mogul Raymond Stuart. All her breathless attempts to see the guy get her nowhere, but when she suddenly stops two men by tap dancing for them, they try giving her a screen test, but she walks out on them because she thinks they are making fun of her. She then gets arrested after trying to break into Raymond Stuart’s home. Everything is in a mess until she is freed by Raymond Stuart himself and becomes a big star.

Cast
 Ann Miller as Terry Baxter
 Jess Barker as George Carter Haven
 Charles D. Brown as Raymond Stuart
 Eddie Kane as Lloyd Marley
 George Eldridge as Berkeley Bell
 Renie Riano as Ms. Tobin
 Clarence Muse as Henry
 Pauline Drake as Evelyn
 Charles La Torre as Coletti
 Anne Loos as Neva Cavendish
 Ray Walker as Fred Wylie
 Charlie Barnet and His Orchestra as Charlie Barnet Orchestra
 Louis Armstrong and His Orchestra as Louis Armstrong Orchestra
 Alvino Rey's Orchestra as Alvino Rey Orchestra
 Jan Garbar's Orchestra as Jan Garbar Orchestra
 Glen Gray & the Casa Loma Orchestra
 Nan Wynn as herself

External links

Jam Session at TCMDB

1944 films
1940s English-language films
American musical comedy films
1944 musical comedy films
American black-and-white films
Columbia Pictures films
Films directed by Charles Barton
1940s American films